Odontolabis gazella is a species of beetles belonging to the family Lucanidae.

Description
The basic colour is dark brown. The large mandible of males are used to wrestle each other for mating or food.

Distribution
This species can be found in Malayan Peninsula, Borneo, Sumatra and Balabac Island (Philippines). The subspecies Odontolabis gazella inaequalis Kaup 1868 is endemic of Nias Island (Indonesia).

References 

 Biolib
 Universal Biological Indexer
 Hallan, Joel Synopsis of the described Coleoptera of the World
 World Field Guide

External links 
 An easy to breed Stag beetle

gazella
Beetles described in 1787
Arthropods of Malaysia